Charles Edward Sebastian (March 30, 1873 – April 17, 1929) was the 30th mayor of Los Angeles, California, serving from 1915 to 1916. He was a Democrat.

Biography
He was born in Farmington, Missouri on March 30, 1873.

Originally a patrolman in the LAPD, Sebastian climbed the ranks to Chief of Police and served in that office from January 3, 1911 to July 16, 1915. He was the first L.A. police chief to be elected mayor, due in no small part to his crusade against vice.

While running for office he became embroiled in a litany of charges but was later acquitted of them all. He did, however, later depart City Hall after adverse publicity concerning his personal life arose from the publication of letters of a damaging nature.

During his brief mayoralty, Sebastian oversaw the annexation of numerous outlying areas, including most of the San Fernando Valley and the West Side.

He died April 17, 1929, and is interred at Glen Haven Memorial Park in Sylmar, California.

External links

 

1929 deaths
Mayors of Los Angeles
Chiefs of the Los Angeles Police Department
1873 births
California Democrats
People from Farmington, Missouri